Rezzakul Haider Chowdhury is a retired Bangladesh Army officer who is the former Director of Directorate General of Forces Intelligence and National Security Intelligence.

Career 
Chowdhury maintained regular contact with Tarique Rahman while at Directorate General of Forces Intelligence. He was the Director General of Directorate General of Forces Intelligence from 2003 to 2004. He met with Paresh Baruah of the United Liberation Front of Asom to discuss smuggling arms for Indian separatist outfit. He also served as Directors General of the National Security Intelligence from 20 April 2008 to 17 March 2009.

Chowdhury was sentenced to death in the 10-Truck Arms and Ammunition Haul in Chittagong on 2014. The arms were destined for ULFA rebels in India. He held meetings with officials of ARY Group and the Pakistan intelligence agency ISI regarding the smuggling of arms. He is currently in prison. Chowdhury was sentenced to death in the 2004 Dhaka grenade attack which was an attempted assassination of Sheikh Hasina, former Prime Minister of Bangladesh and leader of Awami League.

References

Living people
Directors General of the Directorate General of Forces Intelligence
Year of birth missing (living people)
Directors General of National Security Intelligence
Bangladeshi male criminals
Bangladeshi prisoners sentenced to death
Bangladesh Army generals